Traill's flycatcher was a supposed species of tyrant flycatcher in the genus Empidonax, called Empidonax traillii. It was named by John James Audubon after his good British friend Thomas Stewart Traill.

It is now considered to be two distinct but closely related species, which are outwardly very similar but prefer differing habitats and replace each other geographically without significant hybridization:

Alder flycatcher, Empidonax alnorum
Willow flycatcher, Empidonax traillii proper

References

Empidonax
Tyrannidae
Birds by common name